Grindelwald Terminal railway station is a transportation complex in the municipality of Grindelwald in the Swiss canton of Bern. It is the valley station for two cableways: the Eiger Express to the Eiger Glacier, and the Grindelwald–Männlichen to the Männlichen.

The station opened in December 2019, along with the rebuilt Grindelwald–Männlichen cableway.

Services 
 the following services stop at Grindelwald Terminal:

 Cableways:
 Grindelwald–Männlichen: continuous service during the daytime to Männlichen.

References

External links 
 Grindelwald Terminal on jungfrau.ch
 

Railway stations in the canton of Bern
Bernese Oberland Railway stations
Grindelwald
Railway stations in Switzerland opened in 2019